Non-place or nonplace is a neologism coined by the French anthropologist Marc Augé to refer to anthropological spaces of transience where human beings remain anonymous, and that do not hold enough significance to be regarded as "places" in their anthropological definition. Examples of non-places would be motorways, hotel rooms, airports and shopping malls. The term was introduced by Marc Augé in his work Non-places: introduction to an anthropology of supermodernity.

The perception of a space like a non-place is strictly subjective: any given individual can view any given location as a non-place, or as a crossroads of human relations. For instance, a shopping mall is not a non-place for a person who works there every day. 

The concept of non-place is opposed, according to Augé, to the notion of "anthropological place". The place offers people a space that empowers their identity, where they can meet other people with whom they share social references. The non-places, on the contrary, are not meeting spaces and do not build common references to a group. Finally, a non-place is a place we do not live in, in which the individual remains anonymous and lonely. Augé avoids making value judgments on non-places and looks at them from the perspective of an ethnologist who has a new field of studies to explore.

With regard to the classification of shopping malls as non-places, more recently an Italian researcher from the University of Bergamo, Marco Lazzari, developed a survey on a large sample of adolescents, and showed that the mall is a place where teens do not meet by chance, nor with the sole purpose to buy something, but to socialize, meet friends and have fun. Whereas shopping malls are (at least in Italy) yet prejudicially regarded by adults as non-places, they seem to be natively concerned with the identity of the so-called digital natives.

From Places to Non-Places 
A significant debate concerning the term and its interpretation is described in Marc Augé's writings under the title of "From Places to Non-Places". The distinction between places and non-places derives from the opposition between space and place. As essential preliminary here is the analyses of the notions of place and space suggested by Michel de Certeau. Space for him is a frequented space and intersection of moving bodies: it is the pedestrians, who transform the street (geometrically defined by town planners) into a space.

Mark Fisher's notion of non-time 
For Mark Fisher, whereas cyberspace-time tends towards the generation of cultural moments that are interchangeable, hauntology involves the staining of particular places with time: a time that is out of joint. A “flattening sense of time” appears to Fisher as a byproduct of Augé's non-places, which by being absent of local flavour are indeterminate temporally as well as locally. He describes music created decades in the past as deprived of any sense of disjuncture with the present, a clear connection with his theory of capitalist realism.

See also

 Sense of place
Liminality
 :de:Das Ende der Welt
 :de:Nicht-Ort
Cybernetics#Etymology

References

Anthropology
Architectural design